Deruk or Doruk may refer to:
 Deruk, Golestan
 Doruk, Razavi Khorasan
 Deruk, Sistan and Baluchestan